Pelze is a short river of Saxony-Anhalt, Germany. It flows into the Mulde close to its confluence with the Elbe, north of Dessau.

See also
List of rivers of Saxony-Anhalt

Rivers of Saxony-Anhalt
Rivers of Germany